Kazangulovo (Qaźanğol) is a rural locality (a selo) and the administrative centre of Kazangulovsky Selsoviet, Davlekanovsky District, Bashkortostan, Russia. The population was 441 as of 2010. There are 6 streets.

Geography 
Kalinovka is the nearest rural locality.

References 

Rural localities in Davlekanovsky District